"Hand Me Down World" is song written by Kurt Winter, performed and released in 1970 by The Guess Who, for whom Winter served as lead guitarist from 1970 to 1974 and 1977 to 1978.  It reached #10 in Canada, #17 on the Billboard Hot 100, and #65 in Australia.  The song was also released in the United Kingdom as a single, but did not chart.  It is featured on their 1970 album, Share the Land.

The song was produced by Jack Richardson and arranged by The Guess Who.

This song was a rebellion against the older political systems. In the repeated choruses, Cummings and the other vocalists stated that they don't want any hand me down shoes, love, and world, because they "Got one already". Also, the line: "I think we missed it" was another way of going against the establishment.

Cash Box reviewed the song stating "powered by a youth message song and the team’s special fervor, this new Guess Who single maintains the lyric involvement begun by their 'American Woman' giant."

Personnel
Burton Cummings – lead vocals, keyboards
Kurt Winter – lead guitar, backing vocals
Greg Leskiw – rhythm guitar, backing vocals
Jim Kale – bass 
Garry Peterson – drums

Chart performance

Weekly charts

Other versions
Tesla released a version of the song on their 2007 album, Real to Reel.

References

1970 songs
1970 singles
Songs written by Kurt Winter
The Guess Who songs
Tesla (band) songs
Song recordings produced by Jack Richardson (record producer)
RCA Victor singles
RCA Records singles